The 2014 FC Shakhter Karagandy season was the 23rd successive season that the club played in the Kazakhstan Premier League, the highest tier of association football in Kazakhstan. Shakhter Karagandy finished the season in 6th position, reached the Semi-finals of the Kazakhstan Cup and the Third Qualifying Round of the UEFA Europa League.

Squad

Reserve team

Transfers

Winter

In:

Out:

Summer

In:

Out:

Competitions

Kazakhstan Super Cup

Kazakhstan Premier League

First round

Results summary

Results by round

Results

League table

Championship Round

Results summary

Results by round

Results

Table

Kazakhstan Cup

UEFA Europa League

Qualifying rounds

Squad statistics

Appearances and goals

|-
|colspan="14"|Players who appeared for Shakhter Karagandy that left during the season:

|}

Goal scorers

Disciplinary record

References

FC Shakhter Karagandy seasons
Shakhter Karagandy
Shakhter Karagandy